Charles Hudspeth (a.k.a. Andrew J. "Andy" Hudspeth) was an American man convicted of murder in Marion County, Arkansas, in 1887. On December 30, 1892, he was hanged, although his alleged victim was purportedly later found to be alive.

George Watkins and his wife, Rebecca, moved in 1886 from Kansas to Marion County, Arkansas, where Rebecca apparently soon became intimately involved with Charles Hudspeth. The following year, Watkins disappeared.

Rebecca and Hudspeth were arrested and, after lengthy interrogation, Rebecca allegedly made a statement accusing Hudspeth of murdering Watkins to get him out of the way so they could be married.

Based on Rebecca's testimony, Hudspeth was convicted and sentenced to death, but the Arkansas Supreme Court set aside the conviction on the ground that the trial judge, R. H. Powell, had improperly barred testimony regarding Rebecca's alleged lack of good character. Hudspeth v. State, 50 Ark. 534 (1888).

Upon retrial, Hudspeth was again convicted and again sentenced to death. He was hanged at Harrison, Arkansas, on December 30, 1892. In June 1893, Hudspeth's lawyer, W. F. Pace, reportedly located Watkins alive and well in Kansas, although this is disputed.

See also
List of wrongful convictions in the United States

References

1887 murders in the United States
1892 deaths
19th-century executions by the United States
19th-century executions of American people
Murder convictions without a body
Overturned convictions in the United States
People convicted of murder by Arkansas
People convicted of murdering victims who were later found alive
American people wrongfully convicted of murder
People executed by Arkansas by hanging
People executed for murder
People from Marion County, Arkansas
Wrongful executions
Year of birth unknown